Shannon & Wilson, also known as S & W, is an American geotechnical engineering and environmental consultancy firm headquartered in Seattle, Washington founded in 1954. It was founded by William L. Shannon and Stanley D. Wilson (de), both of whom are alumni of Harvard University. The firm offers various geotechnical, geological, and environmental services ranging from natural resource management to geophysical surveying for public and private sectors. The company’s markets include dams and levees, design and construction, energy, federal, industrial, property development, transportation, wastewater management, and waterfront facilities. However, over half of their work is devoted to retrofitting and performing safety investigations on transportation projects.

Founding
The firm is a manifestation of a revolution in civil engineering as a result of the birth of geotechnical engineering which became a new field by the mid 20th century. Radically new concepts were taking shape in soil and rock mechanics pioneered by Professor Arthur Casagrande, a leading figure in geotechnical engineering and who encouraged Shannon and Wilson to form a partnership. The professor and his colleagues, including the founders of the firm, were in the process of establishing the foundation of what later came to be known as geotechnical engineering.

Staff
In 1998, the firm peaked at 130 employees. However, with the introduction of the tax-cutting Initiative 695 and the recession after that, both of which slashed transportation funding, the number of employees was reduced to 90 and has never exceeded 100 staff for several years. However, the company has since grown to more than 300 employees in 11 offices nationwide.

Events

Expansion
Although headquartered in Seattle, the firm has offices based in Richland, Portland, St. Louis, Fairbanks, Anchorage and Denver. The Denver office opened around 2000 to work on a nearby revamp of Interstate 25.

Lawsuits
In 2002, Shannon & Wilson became involved in a lawsuit as a result of property damage initiated by landslides in a residential area on Perkins Lane on top of Magnolia Hill. The court ended up ruling in favor of Shannon & Wilson however.

Recognition
For more than half a century, Shannon & Wilson has played a major role in the design and construction of renowned public and private projects in the Puget Sound region. In recognition of their achievements, each year Shannon & Wilson sponsors the Stanley D. Wilson Memorial Lecture at the University of Washington, the Stanley D. Wilson Fellowship at the University of Illinois, and the William L. Shannon Endowed Fellowship at the University of Washington.

Services 

 Geotechnical Engineering
 Contamination / Remediation
 Geologic Hazards
 Natural Resources
 Water Resources
 Design-Build
 Tunneling / Underground
 Arctic Engineering
 Construction Management

Notable projects
 SR 520 Floating Bridge
 Alaskan Way Viaduct replacement tunnel
 Link light rail
 Tacoma Narrows Bridge
 Seahawks Stadium
 Seattle Center Monorail
 U.S. Courthouse, Seattle
 Lower Meramec River Wastewater Treatment Plant
 Baumgartner Tunnel
 Boston's Central Artery
 Third Harbor Tunnel

References

External links
https://trenchlesstechnology.com/shannon-wilson-announces-2017-promotions/
 Services

Companies based in Seattle
Consulting firms established in 1954
1954 establishments in Washington (state)
Geotechnical engineering companies
Construction and civil engineering companies of the United States
American companies established in 1954
Construction and civil engineering companies established in 1954